The International Society of Drug Bulletins works to increase the sharing of high quality information on medical treatments and medication between countries. It was started in 1986 and is supported by the World Health Organization.

To be a member publishers must have a certain level of independence from conflicts of interest and publish at least quarterly.

Members include: Australian Prescriber, La revue Prescrire, Drug and Therapeutics Bulletin, Therapeutics Initiative, Worst Pills Best Pills and Arzneiverordnung in der Praxis among others.

References

Organizations established in 1986
World Health Organization
International medical and health organizations